Alda Borelli (4 November 1879 - 25 May 1964) was an Italian stage and cinema actress. The sister of Lyda Borelli, she was active in the era of silent film but is best known for her stage work.

In 1922, she played Beatrice in an Italian translation of Percy Bysshe Shelley's The Cenci.

References

External links
 

1879 births
1964 deaths
Italian film actresses
Italian silent film actresses
Italian stage actresses
20th-century Italian actresses
Italian child actresses